"The Night Has a Thousand Eyes" is a song written by Benjamin Weisman, Dorothy Wayne, and Marilyn Garrett. It became a popular hit in 1962 for Bobby Vee and has had several cover versions over the years.

Bobby Vee version
The song was first recorded by American pop music singer Bobby Vee, at United Recorders, Hollywood, California. The recording was arranged by Ernie Freeman and produced by Snuff Garrett.

Released as a single in late 1962, it spent 14 weeks on the Billboard Hot 100 chart, reaching number 3, while ranking number 2 on Billboards Middle-Road Singles chart, and number 8 on Billboards Hot R&B Singles chart. It also spent 12 weeks on the UK's Record Retailer chart, achieving number 3 on March 6, 1963. The song was included on his 1963 Liberty Records album, The Night Has a Thousand Eyes. Vee also recorded a Scopitone promotional video for the song.

Chart performance

Weekly charts

Year-end charts

Other versions
In 1965, Gary Lewis & the Playboys on their first album This Diamond Ring; it can also be heard on their album Complete Hits.
In 1973, The Carpenters on their album Now & Then.
Alex Proyas' 1998 science fiction film, Dark City, includes a scene by Jennifer Connelly singing a jazzy, sultry minor key version of the song as a singer in a nightclub. In the film, the "thousand eyes" motif contributes to the theme of surveillance that permeates the film.  In the Theatrical release, Anita Kelsey dubs her voice over Connelly's.  In Proyas' Director's Cut, Jennifer's singing voice is her own.

References

External links
 

1962 singles
Songs with music by Ben Weisman
Bobby Vee songs
The Angels (American group) songs
Gary Lewis & the Playboys songs
1962 songs
Liberty Records singles
Irish Singles Chart number-one singles